Grenadian is an adjective describing someone or something from the country of Grenada.

It may refer to:

 Grenadian Creole English, an Eastern Atlantic Creole
 Grenadian Creole French or Patois, a variety of Antillean Creole French
 Grenadian cuisine, a diversity of foods
 Grenadian dollar, a history and overview of the currency
 Grenadian music, a mix of styles
 Grenadian people, the demographics of the country 
 Grenadian politics, an overview of the structure and functioning of the government

See also
 Grenadine (disambiguation)
 

Language and nationality disambiguation pages